Pantala is a genus of dragonfly in the family Libellulidae 
commonly called the rainpool gliders. They are found almost worldwide.
Species of Pantala are medium-sized to large, dull orange-yellow dragonflies.

Species
The genus Pantala includes the following species:

References

External links

Libellulidae
Anisoptera genera
Odonata of Africa
Odonata of Asia
Odonata of Australia
Odonata of Oceania
Taxa named by Hermann August Hagen
Insects described in 1861